Muhammed Tijani is a former Ghanaian footballer who played for Cornerstones F.C. He was adjudged the Ghana Premier League top goal scorer in 1990.

Career 
Tijani played for Cornerstones FC. During the 1989–90 Ghana Premier League season, he scored 15 goals to win the top scorer award.

Honours

Individual 

 Ghana Premier League Top scorer: 1989–90

References

External links 

Living people
Year of birth missing (living people)
Association football forwards
Ghanaian footballers
Cornerstones F.C. players
Ghana Premier League players
Ghana Premier League top scorers